Braian Ezequiel Oyola (born 15 June 1996) is an Argentine professional footballer who plays as a winger or forward for Tristán Suárez.

Career
Oyola, after signing from Tigre in 2017, started his senior career with Atlanta. A 1–0 win over Colegiales on 4 September 2017 allowed Oyola to make his professional debut, in a Primera B Metropolitana fixture that originally ended in a draw before the AFA awarded the points to Atlanta as Colegiales used an ineligible player. He scored his first goal on his twenty-second appearance for the club, netting in a 3–1 victory over Justo José de Urquiza in November 2018.

In February 2021, Oyola joined fellow league club CSyD Tristán Suárez.

Career statistics
.

References

External links

1996 births
Living people
Footballers from Buenos Aires
Argentine footballers
Association football wingers
Primera B Metropolitana players
Club Atlético Atlanta footballers
CSyD Tristán Suárez footballers
21st-century Argentine people